Erwin Obermair (29 August 1946 in Hargelsberg – 15 January 2017 in Linz) was an Austrian amateur astronomer and co-discoverer of asteroids.

Together with his colleague and amateur astronomer Erich Meyer, Obermair built the private observatory Meyer/Obermair in Davidschlag (municipality Kirchschlag bei Linz, Austria), in 1978. He co-discovered a total of 7 asteroids at this observatory, all together with Meyer. Furthermore, he was involved in three other discoveries of asteroids between 1996 and 2005, which were assigned as site discoveries to the observatory Davidschlag by the International Astronomical Union.

Obermair was a member of the Astronomical Society of Linz (Linzer Astronomische Gemeinschaft), from 1974 until his death he was vice president of that association. His most important observations include precisie astrometry of the comet Shoemaker–Levy 9, which he observerd together with Erich Meyer and Herbert Raab in 1993. These observations have significantly contributed to the subsequent prediction of the impact of this comet on the planet Jupiter.

On 4 April 1997, Obermair was presented the Decoration of Honour in Silver of the Republic of Austria. The main-belt asteroid 9236 Obermair, discovered by his college Erich Meyer at Linz in 1997, was named in his honor. Naming citation was published on 4 May 1999.

He was well educated in geology and astronomy on top of that a passioned astrophotographer.

Obermair was married.

References 
 

20th-century Austrian astronomers
Discoverers of asteroids
1946 births
2017 deaths

Scientists from Linz
21st-century Austrian astronomers